Adrian White may refer to:

 Adrian White (American football) (born 1964), former American football player
 Adrian White (author), Anglo-Irish writer
 Sir Adrian White (businessman) (born 1942), British businessman
 Adrian White (equestrian) (born 1933), New Zealand show jumper
 Adrian White (musician), Canadian drummer